Strand is a high-level symbolic language for parallel computing, similar in syntax to Prolog.

Artificial Intelligence Ltd were awarded the British Computer Society Award for Technical Innovation 1989 for Strand88.
The language was created by computer scientists Ian Foster and Stephen Taylor.

Implementations 
Felix Winkelmann's web site - Strand, Felix Winkelmann's GitLab repository

Further reading 

Foster, Ian; Stephen Taylor: Strand: new concepts in parallel programming. .

Concurrent programming languages
Prolog programming language family